The 2005–06 season was the 104th season in the existence of Vicenza Calcio and the club's fifth consecutive season in the second division of Italian football. In addition to the domestic league, Vicenza participated in this season's edition of the Coppa Italia.

Players

First-team squad

Transfers

Pre-season and friendlies

Competitions

Overall record

Serie B

League table

Results summary

Results by round

Matches

Coppa Italia

References

L.R. Vicenza seasons
Vicenza